Yei River State was a state in South Sudan that existed between the date of 2 October 2015 upto 22 February 2020.

Location 
It was located in the Equatoria region and it bordered Maridi and Amadi to the north, Jubek to the northeast, and Imatong to the east. Yei River State, along with Jubek State and Terekeka State was part of the former state of Central Equatoria. The capital and largest city of Yei River State is Yei, South Sudan, with the city having an estimated population of 260,720 in 2014.

History
On 2 October 2015, President Salva Kiir issued a decree establishing 28 states in place of the 10 constitutionally established states. The decree established the new states largely along ethnic lines. A number of opposition parties and civil society groups challenged the constitutionality of the decree. Kiir later resolved to take it to parliament for approval as a constitutional amendment. In November of that year, the South Sudanese parliament empowered President Kiir to create new states. David Lokonga Moses was appointed Governor on 24 December 2015.

In November 2017, the Deputy Governor of Yei River State, also a colonel in the army, Augustino Kiri Gwolo, died of yellow fever in Juba.He was replaced by colonel Abraham Wani who later  on defected to the National Salvation Front in 2016 after th insurgence of the civil war in south sudan  'Since its creation in 2017, the National Salvation Front (NAS) insurgency was located primarily in Yei River State.

Geography
Administrative divisions
After the split up, Yei River State broke down even further for a total of 10 counties in the state (created in April 2016). The 10 counties are part of the 180 counties in South Sudan. The 10 counties are consisted of the following:

 Former Kajo-Keji County:
 Kajo-Keji
 ŋepo (Nyepo)
 Kangapo one
 Kangapo Two
 liwolo
 Former Lainya County:
 Lainya
 Kupera
 Former Morobo County Morobo
 Lujule
 Former Yei River County:
 Yei
 Otogo
 Tore
 Mugwo
The counties are further sub-divided into payams, and the payams are then further sub-divided into bomas'.

Towns and cities
Yei is the most populous town in Yei River State, with an estimated population of over 260,000 in 2014. The city of Yei is located in Yei River County. Other populated towns in Yei River State include Dimo (located on the border with the Democratic Republic of the Congo)'', Kajo Keji, and Kaya. Kajo Keji is the second most populous city in the state, with an estimated population of 196,000 in 2010.

Ethnic groups
A 2013 survey had reported a majority of Kakwa people, with minorities of Avukaya, Baka, Keliko, Mundu, and Pojulu people though other ethnic grops from all parts of south suadn are also living there.

References

Equatoria
States of South Sudan
States and territories disestablished in 2020